KJCV (1450 AM) is a radio station licensed to Jackson, Wyoming, United States. The station is currently owned by Bott Radio Network, through licensee Community Broadcasting.

References

External links

 
 

JCV (AM)
Bott Radio Network stations